Spiritualist art or spirit art or mediumistic art or psychic painting is a form of art, mainly painting, influenced by spiritualism.
Spiritualism influenced art, having an influence on artistic consciousness, with spiritual art having a huge impact on what became modernism and therefore art today.

Famous spiritual artists include Georgiana Houghton and Piet Mondrian.

Spiritualism also inspired the pioneering abstract art of Vasily Kandinsky, Piet Mondrian, Kasimir Malevich and František Kupka.

Precipitated paintings
"Precipitation" is works of art that appeared on canvas, ostensibly without the use of human hands, during a Spiritualist seance. In this case, the mediums claimed that the spirits produced the paintings directly, rather than by guiding the hands of a human artist.

Automatic drawing
Automatic drawings  (distinguished from surrealist automatism), a term thought to originate with Anna Mary Howitt, were produced by mediums and practitioners of the psychic arts. It was thought by Spiritualists to be a spirit control that was producing the drawing while physically taking control of the medium’s body. An alternative term for this is psychic painting.

Portraying the spirits
In the heyday of Spiritualism, it became very common for mediums to sketch portraits of spirits who they claimed were present during the seances.

Auragraphs

Auragraphs, which represent a person’s past, present, and potential as seen by a medium or clairvoyant. The name was coined, and the technique developed, by British medium Harold Sharp (1890-1980).

Spirit architecture
The Iulia Hasdeu Castle is a folly built in the form of a small castle by historian and politician Bogdan Petriceicu Hașdeu in the city of Câmpina, Romania. He claimed that his dead daughter, Iulia Hasdeu, provided the plans for building the castle during sessions of spiritism.

In the 1880s, Senator Federico Rosazza (1813-1899), an Italian politician connected with Masonic and spiritualist circles, commissioned the painter and architect Giuseppe Maffei (1821-1901), to convert a pre-existing village into a new town with his name, Rosazza. Maffei, a spiritualist, claimed that he received messages on how to build Rosazza from the spirits, including Saint Augustine.

See also
 Automatic writing
 Spirit photography
 Thoughtography
 Religious art

References

Further reading 
 Early and contemporary spirit artists, psychic artists and medium painters from 5,000 B.C. to the present day. History, Study, Analysis, Maximillien de Lafayette, 2017
 The Spiritual Dynamic in Modern Art - Art History Reconsidered, 1800 to the Present, Charlene Spretnak, Palgrave Macmillan US, 2014
 Enchanted Modernities: Theosophy, the Arts and the American West, Sarah Victoria Turner, Fulgur Limited, 2019
 Spiritualism and the Visual Imagination in Victorian Britain, Rachel Oberter, Yale University, 2007
 Precipitated Spirit Paintings, Ron Nagy, 2006
 Psychic Art, Seeing is Believing, Marion Voy, 2005
 Introduction to Psychic Art and Psychic Readings : An Easy-to-Use, Step-by-Step Illustrated Guidebook, Kim Roberts, Lucy Byatt, Findhorn Press Ltd, 2017
 Outsider Art: Visionary Worlds and Trauma, Daniel Wojcik, Univ. Press of Mississippi, 2016
 The 300 masterpieces of art brut, outsider art, psychic art, spirit art, intuitive art, illuminated art, mediumistic art, Maximillien de Lafayette
 Spirit Paintings and Art from the Afterlife: The Greatest Spirit Artists and Medium Painters of all Time, Maximillien de Lafayette, 2015

External links 
 Spirituality Has Long Been Erased From Art History. Here's Why It's Having a Resurgence Today
 
 Spiritualism and the Visual Arts – WRSP
 http://www.spiritual-healing-artwork-4u.com/precipitated-spirit-painting.html

 
Art movements
Spiritualism